General elections were held in Venezuela on 7 December 1958. The presidential elections were won by Rómulo Betancourt of Democratic Action, who received 49.2% of the vote, whilst his party won 73 of the 132 seats in the Chamber of Deputies and 32 of the 51 seats in the Senate. Voter turnout was 93.4% in the presidential election and 92.1% in the Congressional elections.

The Soviet Union covertly supported Wolfgang Larrazábal in the elections.

Results

President

Congress

References

1958 in Venezuela
Venezuela
Elections in Venezuela
Presidential elections in Venezuela
Rómulo Betancourt